This is a list of communal flags in France. Communal flags are rarely used in France as communes usually favor coats of arms. As a result, the info presented in this list also describes coats of arms.

Metropolitan regions

Auvergne-Rhône-Alpes

Bourgogne-Franche-Comté

Brittany

Centre-Val de Loire

Corsica

Grand Est

Hauts-de-France

Île-de-France

Normandy

Nouvelle-Aquitaine

Occitania

Pays de la Loire

Provence-Alpes-Côte d'Azur

Overseas region

See also 
 List of French flags
 Flag of France

References

External links 
 Les emblèmes de France
 Pourquoi doter sa commune d'un drapeau ?

French communes

France